Karlskoga is a locality and the seat of Karlskoga Municipality, Sweden. Located within Örebro County, 45 km (28 mi) west of Örebro, and 10 km (6 mi) north of Degerfors. With a 2020 population of 27,386 distributed over 10.55 square miles (27.33 km2), Karlskoga is the second-largest city in both Örebro County and the historical province of Värmland.

Karlskoga straddles the northern shore of Lake Möckeln. Among the city's main topographical features are the two rivers, Timsälven and Svartälven. Other features include an esker, Rävåsen, contiguous with the city center. The broader Karlskoga-area differs from its bordering regions, as covered by woodlands and an uneven topography that more fitted other activities rather than agricultural practices.

Karlskoga evolved around the arms manufacturer Bofors, and by 1970, it counted almost 10,000 employees. The many jobs in the arms industry during the 1900s multiplied Karlskoga's population. Today, Karlskoga is still a thriving center of the arms industry, but its economy is more diverse than during the peak-Bofors era.

Karlskoga is also home to the Björkborn Manor, on the property of the Björkborn Works, where Alfred Nobel lived. His residency there is the reason his will was adjudicated in Karlskoga at Karlshall, establishing the Nobel Prize. Other landmarks include the Nobel Laboratory, the Karlskoga Church, Mässen, and the Bofors Hotel.

Etymology 
Karlskoga was initially called Möckelns bodar, Möckelsboderna or Bodarna, being derived from cottages located at the shore of lake Möckeln. The locality's name "Karlskoga" was coined in 1591, and has been in use ever since. It is derived from Charles (Karl) IX, with skog meaning woods.

History

Pre-16th century

16th century 
Karlskoga and its surrounding area were sparsely populated in the beginning of the 16th century. It was not until the 1580s that the area started to see an increase in population, when Charles IX made people settle in the area. Ethnic Swedes (people from the historical provinces of Närke and Södermanland), and particularly Finns, began to settle the area, where they took up the farming method slash-and-burn. They were followed by Huguenots, fleeing religious oppression in France, and by other groups including both Dutch and German settlers, mostly skilled metalsmiths.

The parish of Karlskoga was established in 1586 and a wooden church was soon built. It was small in size, and was solely made up of the sacristy still preserved at this site, which was a consequence of population increase in the years prior. The first priest elected was Olaus Gestricius, by the late 1500s. In the 17th century fourteen small iron works and eight waterdriven hammers for bar iron were established. Most of these were still operating in the 1860s, but the dominating ironworks was the one in nearby Bofors. In 1871, Bofors produced 6,124 metric tons of iron, more than any other plant in Sweden. In 1882, Karlskoga parish (socken) had 11,184 inhabitants.

19th century 

The town of Karlskoga has evolved around Bofors, which in the late 19th century was transformed from an iron works to a manufacturer of cannon and in the 20th century to a more diversified defense industry. Bofors was incorporated in 1873 and has since the 1880s been specializing in the lucrative manufacture of cannon. 

The most famous owner of Bofors was Alfred Nobel, who owned the company from 1894 until his death in December 1896. He had a key role in reshaping the ironworks to a modern cannon manufacturer and chemical industry. During the summers of 1894–1896 he lived in the manor house Björkborn. Even though he died in his villa in Sanremo, Italy and had a home in Paris, it was decided that his legal residence was at Björkborn in Karlskoga. Because of that it was here his famous testament that was written in Paris in 1895 was legally registered, which eventually made it possible to establish the Nobel Prize.

20th century 
In 1940 the town of Karlskoga and the surrounding area (the same territory as today's Karlskoga Municipality) got the formal title of a city (stad). Since 1971 this term has no legal meaning and only the built-up area is considered a de facto town. Karlskoga spent most of the 20th century as a growing company town to Bofors. Only with the demilitarization in the most recent decades has this started to be a problem for the town. There were 8,500 workers in Bofors in 1980, but the number had decreased to 2,600 as of 1998.

Geography 
Karlskoga is situated more or less in a low mountainous ridge called Kilsbergen that separates Närke from Värmland.

Such areas have traditionally been financially poor. This led to a significant Swedish emigration to North America from the district in the latter half of the 19th century. Stockholm, Wisconsin was for instance founded in 1854 by immigrants from Karlskoga.

Neighbourhoods 
The many residential communities of Karlskoga express a character distinct to the company town. Million programme residential buildings can be found in enclaves such as Baggängen, Ekeby, Sandviken and Skranta. 

The Rosendal neighbourhood, historically significant for the architecture of its homes, planned community by the Bofors Works, was designated as an area of national interest for cultural heritage.

Demographics 
Karlskoga's population grew steadily from the time when arms manufacturer Bofors had started to expand, until the 1970s. Thereafter, it underwent a sharp decline (down by almost 10,000 inhabitants over a 30-year period), with signs of recovery only in the very last few years as of 2021. Nevertheless, with 27,386 inhabitants, Karlskoga is the second most populous place in Örebro County following Örebro (126,009).

The presence of foreign residents in Karlskoga accounts for 16.5 % of inhabitants. This compares with 19.1 % in the town Örebro.

Ethnicity 
In the 1580s, a total of five Finns settled in Möckelsbodar (present-day Karlskoga). In 1649, 32 of a total of 186 agricultural holdings were occupied by Finns.

In 2017, the three most commonly reported ethnic origins (by-birth) overall were Finns (935 or 3.1 per cent), Syrians (650 or 2.1 per cent) and Somalis (409 or 1.3 per cent).

Religion 
Various religious denominations and congregations are based in Karlskoga, including the Saint George Catholic congregation, established in 1956, and the Bofors Baptist congregation, established in 1884.

Language and dialects 
In 2012, Karlskoga Municipality received its status as a Finnish-speaking administrative municipality.

Economy 
The city is an important center for the arms manufacturing and pharmaceutical industries; it is home to various multinational corporations, including subsidiaries and -divisions of Bharat Forge, BAE Systems, Saab AB (SAAB Bofors Dynamics), Cambrex Corporation, Recipharm, and Moelven Industrier.

Sports
Karlskoga is home to several stadiums, of which Nobelhallen is the largest (it hosted the 1979 World Junior Ice Hockey Championships).

Professional sports 
Karlskoga is home to the ice hockey team BIK Karlskoga, currently playing as per the 2021–2022 season in HockeyAllsvenskan, the second tier of Swedish ice hockey.

There is also a football team called KB Karlskoga FF, and a women's soccer team, Rävåsen IK.

Notable people

Arts

 Monica Forsberg, singer, songwriter and actress

Sports

 Agneta Andersson, sprint canoer, Olympic gold medalist
 Bengt-Åke Gustafsson, former NHL player
 Anna Karlsson, sprint canoer
 Maria Haglund, sprint canoer, Olympic bronze medalist
 Johan Motin, NHL player
 Ulrika Knape, diver, winner of one gold and two silver Olympic medals

Others

 Peter Arvai, co-founder of Prezi

 Alfred Nobel. He lived at the Björkborn Manor house, on the property of the Bofors works, which he owned. His residency there is the reason his will was adjudicated in Karlskoga, establishing the Nobel Prizes.

  Stina Swartling, writer

International relations

Twin towns – Sister cities
Karlskoga is twinned with:
 Aalborg, Denmark
 Húsavík, Iceland
 Riihimäki, Finland
 Narva, Estonia
 Sanremo, Italy
 Wheaton, Illinois, United States
 Olaine, Latvia
 Fredrikstad, Norway

Notes

References

Citations

Works cited

Further reading

External links 

Karlskoga
Municipal seats of Örebro County
Swedish municipal seats
Populated places in Karlskoga Municipality
Populated lakeshore places in Sweden